Elbgaustraße railway station is on the Hamburg-Altona–Kiel line and is served by the city trains located in Hamburg, Germany. The railway station is located in the quarter of Eidelstedt in the Eimsbüttel borough. After on 16 July 1922 the Eidelstedt marshalling yard (Verschiebebahnhof) had opened and, after the Reichsbahn had established railwaymen in company housings in the environs, a first station for suburban traffic was opened. This was already named Elbgaustraße. In 1965 the old platform was rebuilt and electrified for the S-Bahn service.

Station layout
The station is an elevated island platform with 2 tracks and two exit. The station is fully accessible for handicapped persons, because there is a lift and a special floor layout for blind persons.

Station services

Trains
The rapid transit trains of the lines S3 and S21 of the Hamburg S-Bahn are calling the station. The station is a terminus for the S21.

Direction of the trains on track 1 is Pinneberg (S3). On track 2 the trains are traveling in the direction Stade (S3) and Aumühle (S21) via Hamburg central station. The S3 needs 33 minutes to the central station, the S21 only 18 minutes via Holstenstraße.

Buses
Several bus lines are calling a bus stop in front.

Facilities at the station
A small shop in the station sells fast food and newspapers. There are no lockerboxes. No personnel is attending the station, but there are SOS and information telephones, ticket machines, 25 bicycle stands and 300 park and ride parking lots. In front of the station is a taxicab stand.

See also

 Hamburger Verkehrsverbund (HVV)
 List of Hamburg S-Bahn stations

References

External links

DB station information 
Network plan HVV (pdf) 560 KiB 

Hamburg S-Bahn stations in Hamburg
Buildings and structures in Eimsbüttel